Microcyphus is a genera of echinoderms belonging to the order Temnopleuridae.

Species

Fossils
Microcyphus iglahensis  
Microcyphus javanus 
Microcyphus melo

References

External links

Temnopleuridae
Echinoidea genera